Laranjeira is a surname. Notable people with the name include:

 João Laranjeira (born 1951), Portuguese footballer
 Manoel Ceia Laranjeira (1903–1994), Brazilian bishop of the Independent Catholicism movement
 Thomas Laranjeira (born 1992), French rugby union player
 Laranjeira (footballer) (born 2000), Brazilian footballer

See also
 Laranjeiras (disambiguation)